The University of Washington Department of Bioengineering (UW Bioengineering) is a joint department of the College of Engineering and School of Medicine, and is located in Seattle, Washington, USA.

Overview 

The Department of Bioengineering offers undergraduate and graduate degrees in bioengineering, a field at the interface between medicine and engineering. As of 2022, the department includes 51 active core faculty, including six members of the National Academy of Engineering. The faculty conduct a mix of basic and applied multi-disciplinary research; particularly in the following six areas: regenerative medicine & biomaterials, molecular & cellular engineering; instrumentation, imaging & image-guided therapy; systems, synthetic and quantitative biology; neural engineering and technology for expanding access to health care. In 2022, UW Bioengineering was awarded US$30,219,529 million in research funding, primarily from federal sources such as the National Institutes of Health, United States Department of Defense and National Science Foundation.

In addition to the core faculty, which is 38% female, the department comprises 49 adjunct faculty, 51 affiliate faculty, 53 postdoctoral fellows, 195 graduate students and 221 undergraduate students.

History

The UW Center for Bioengineering was founded in 1967 by Robert Rushmer as a joint research enterprise of the UW College of Engineering and the UW School of Medicine to study the cardiovascular system. A main focus was groundbreaking work on the development of quieter, portable Doppler ultrasound instruments for monitoring the cardiovascular system and fetal heart rate, building on work that Rushmer had begun at the UW in 1958.  These developments formed the basis for a strong local ultrasound industry that persist to this day.

With the Center for Bioengineering, Dr. Rushmer aimed to develop a joint research enterprise of the UW College of Engineering and UW School of Medicine to study the cardiovascular system.
As its research foci expanded, the Center received the ability to grant PhD degrees in 1984. Undergraduate courses were added in 1985. The Center became the Department of Bioengineering in 1997. Its undergraduate program was approved in 2000, which was accredited by the Accreditation Board for Engineering and Technology (ABET) in 2008 (retroactive to 2006). In 2006, the department moved into the new William H. Foege Building, a 265,000 sq. ft. research facility on campus adjacent to Seattle’s Portage Bay that includes offices, laboratories, and support facilities.

Degrees offered

UW Bioengineering offers the following degree programs:
 Bachelor of Science (ABET-accredited)
 Master of Science
 5 year combined Bachelor/Master of Science
 Doctor of Philosophy (Ph.D)
 Master of Applied Bioengineering (MAB)
 Master of Pharmaceutical Bioengineering (PharBE) - online professional master's degree program, offered in partnership  with UW Professional and Continuing Education
Certificates in basic bioscience, translational pharmaceutics, and drug discovery and design, in partnership with UW Professional and Continuing Education. 
Bioengineering students may also participate in the MD/PhD program, administered by the UW Medical Scientist Training Program.

Admissions
Admission to UW Bioengineering is competitive.

Graduate programs
The number of applications to the PhD program averages at around 500 per year. The average acceptance rate is 14%.

The GRE exam is optional for applying to all graduate programs. The average GPAs of students accepted are as follows:

 Ph.D. program: (GPA): 3.8
 M.S. program (GPA): 3.7

Undergraduate program
The Bioengineering Undergraduate students progress sequentially through a core curriculum, with opportunities for electives and hands-on research and design projects. Direct to College of Engineering (DTC) students request placement at the end of freshman year. Transfer students and current UW students apply to the department during their sophomore year. Each cohort is made up of DTC, transfer and current UW students. All students must be major-ready for the Bioengineering program in the Spring by completing all the prerequisites by the end of Winter quarter.

The Bachelor of Science in Bioengineering is a capacity-constrained major and UW Bioengineering uses a holistic process to review applications and requests. Factors include grade trends, especially in prerequisite courses, the personal statement, and considerations such as difficulty of completed courses, overcoming hardships, applicable work or research experience, and an understanding of the field of bioengineering.

Commercialization (Technology Transfer)
Thanks to close association with the clinical departments in the UW School of Medicine, and strong local biomedical and biotech industries, the department has a long history of translational research. Today, as an active partner with UW’s CoMotion, UW Bioengineering is continually inventing new technologies and moving them from the lab to the bedside. Bioengineering typically ranks 1st or 2nd among UW departments in reporting inventions.

As of 2022, commercialization efforts in UW Bioengineering have yielded 1,918 patents filed, 550 patents issued, 107 active licenses and 1005 invention disclosures. Forty-seven existing start-up companies have benefited from the intellectual property generated by faculty and student research including AltPep and Anavasi Diagnostics.

In 2015, UW Bioengineering launched its UW BioEngage Program. The BioEngage program aims to build sustainable, mutually beneficial relationships with individuals, nonprofits, and industry in Seattle and around the world, and foster UW Bioengineering students' professional development and preparation for careers in biomedical industries.

References

External links 
 UW Bioengineering
 University of Washington
 UW College of Engineering
 UW Medicine

Colleges, schools, and departments of the University of Washington